{{DISPLAYTITLE:C22H28N2O4}}
The molecular formula C22H28N2O4 may refer to:

 3-Hydroxy-16-methoxy-2,3-dihydrotabersonine
 Isovoacristine
 Rhynchophylline
 Voacristine
 Voacangine hydroxyindolenine